The Central Autónoma de Trabalhadores is a trade union federation in Brazil. It is affiliated with the International Trade Union Confederation.

References

External links
www.cat-ipros.org.br website.

Trade unions in Brazil
International Trade Union Confederation
Brazil